Jan Eberle (born May 20, 1989) is a Czech professional ice hockey forward who currently plays for HC Plzeň in the Czech Extraliga.

References

External links

1989 births
Czech ice hockey forwards
Rytíři Kladno players
HC Olomouc players
HC Plzeň players
Living people
Seattle Thunderbirds players
Sportspeople from Kladno
Czech expatriate ice hockey players in the United States